The men's marathon (T54) at the 2022 Commonwealth Games, as part of the athletics programme, was held in Birmingham on 30 July 2022.

Records
Prior to this competition, the existing world and Games records were as follows:

Schedule
The schedule was as follows:

All times are British Summer Time (UTC+1)

Results
The results of the marathon race are given below:-

References

Men's marathon (T54)
2022 in men's athletics
Comm
2022 Commonwealth Game